Sout El-Hob Records (from Arabic:صوت الحب للإنتاج الفني والتوزيع, "The Voice of Love") is an Egyptian record label founded in 1972 by Atef Montasser. Sout El-Hob has the 4th largest Arabic music catalog in the Middle East & North Africa. It  has also distributed many movies domestically and abroad under the name of “Sout El-Hob Movies." Mohsen also worked with Atef as a distributor before he set up his own company.

Ownership 
In 2015, Sherif Montasser, Atef Montasser’s nephew, took over Sout El-Hob as owner and CEO through Sout El-Hob Entertainment, one of the companies Dozzan Music Group owns.

Content 
Hany Shaker is one of the first singers that Sout El-Hob discovered and produced his first 4 releases. Montasser is credited with discovering the talents of Ahmed Adaweyah, Aziza Jalal, Mohamed Fouad, Medhat Saleh, and Metkal Kenawy. He is also credited with bringing the Algerian singer Warda to prominence, and he produced one of her movies entitled “Ah ya liel ya zaman” in 1977. Sout El-Hob has distributed many movies domestically and abroad under the name of “Sout El-Hob Movies (Atef Montasser and his Partners)”, and recorded Omar Khairat’s music, the recited Quran by Sheikh Mahmoud Khalil Al-Hussary. The Quran was composed of 31 cassettes and recited by Sheikh al-Tablawi. Sout El-Hob has revived the musical heritage of Sayed Darwish after discovering the talent of Iman El Bahr Darwish, and recorded the songs of Fayza Ahmed and Najat on cassettes for the first time. Moreover, Sout El-Hob has produced a song titled “Fe Aman Allah” by Mohammed Abdu in his early career.

Atef Montasser met composer Hani Shenouda in the mid-1970s, and they established “El-Masryeen Band”. The first cassette for the band was released in 1977, containing eight short songs. The recording process took eight months and the cassette tapes were imported from Germany and Switzerland. The members of the band included Mona Aziz, Eman Younis, Tahseen Yalmaz, Mamdouh Qassem and Omar Fathi. Many prominent poets have written songs for the band, including Salah Jahin and Omar Batesha. Montasser also met Doctor Ezzat Abu Ouf in the mid-1970s and they established together a band titled “Four M”. The members of the band were Ezzat Abu Ouf's sisters: Mona, Maha, Manal and Mervat.   

EMI, a British record company, selected Sout El-Hob to be its partner and take charge of its production in the Arab world in 1985. This partnership lasted for six years. Sout El-Hob has the fourth largest Arabic music catalog in the Middle East and North Africa (MENA). In 2013, EMI was acquired by Universal Music, its subsidiaries were subsequently broken up, and portions of the company were sold to other entities. Sout El-Hob was eventually acquired by Mazzika Group.

Sout El-Hob artists

Notable artists who have recorded for the company 

 Ahmed Adaweyah
 Warda Al-Jazairia
 El-Masryeen Band
 Hamid Al-Shairi
 Mohammad Fouad
 Medhat Saleh
 Radi Zeus
 Leila Mourad
 Omar Khairat
 Hany Shaker
 Najat Al Saghira
 Iman El Bahr Darwish
 Aziza Jalal
 Fatma Eid
 Fayza Ahmed
 Four M
 Hany Mehanna
 Hany Shanouda
 Huda Sultan
 Mohamed El-Helw
 Majd El Qassem
 Mohammed Tharwat
 Mohammed Abdu
 Metkal Kenawy

Sout El-Hob songs

Some of Sout El-Hob's iconic songs 

"El Sah El Dah Embo" by Ahmed Adaweyah
 "Esmaouny" by Warda Al-Jazairia
 "Fe El Seka" by Mohammad Fouad
 "Keda Bardo Ya Amar" by Hany Shaker
 "Kawkab Tany" by Medhat Saleh
 "Matehsebosh Ya Banat" by El-Masryeen Band
 "El Leila El Kebira" by Four M band
 "Mahsobkom Endas" by Iman El Bahr Darwish
 "Fe Aman Allah" by Mohammed Abdu

Distribution

Artist and labels with music distributed by Modissa

Notable artists 

 Amr Diab
 Fairuz
 Tamer Hosny
 Ahmed Mekky
 Amal Maher
 Hany shaker
 Adham Seliman
 Cairokee
 Tamer Ashour
 Mahmoud El Esseily
 Mohammad Al Sharnouby
 Abyusif
 Radi Zeus
 Illmagdy
 Cheb Khaled
 Sherine
 Nawal El Zoughbi
 Saber Rebaei
 Amr Mostafa
Carmen Seliman
Angham
Nancy Ajram

Notable record labels 

 Sout El-Hob (Entire catalog)
 Sonar (Entire catalog)
 Watary 
 Sout El Delta
 Randaphone
 Takima
 El Sobky

External links

References 

Record labels established in 1972
Egyptian record labels
EMI
Universal Music Group
Arab record labels
Record label distributors
Music industry
Entertainment industry